Corymbia kombolgiensis, commonly known as the scarp gum or the paper-fruited bloodwood, is a species of small tree that is endemic to the Northern Territory. It has smooth bark, sometimes with rough, tessellated bark near the base, linear to narrow lance-shaped adult leaves, flower buds usually in groups of seven, white flowers and cylindrical to barrel-shaped fruit.

Description
It has smooth creamy white to brownish bark, sometimes with rough, grey, tessellated bark on the lower part of the trunk. Flowering has been observed in August, October and November and the flowers are white.

Taxonomy and naming
Scarp gum was first formally described in 1978 by Ian Brooker and Clyde Dunlop in the journal Australian Forest Research, and was given the name Eucalyptus kombolgiensis. The type specimens were collected by Dunlop on Mount Brockman (in Kakadu National Park) in 1977. In 1995, Ken Hill and Lawrie Johnson changed the name of this species to Corymbia kombolgiensis. The specific epithet (kombolgiensis) is a reference to the Kombolgie sandstone, where this species is common.

Distribution and habitat
Corymbia kombolgiensis grows in open forest on sandstone escarpments and plateaus from PineCreek to the Arnhem Land plateau.

See also
 List of Corymbia species

References

kombolgiensis
Myrtales of Australia
Flora of the Northern Territory
Plants described in 1978